Yuri Nikolaevich Arabov (born 25 October 1954) is a Russian screenwriter, writer, poet and educator. He is known for his long-lasting collaboration with Alexander Sokurov. He is an Honored Artist of the Russian Federation (1999).

Biography
Yuri Arabov was born in Moscow into a mixed Russian-Greek family. His parents met in Tula, Russia, the native town of his father, but divorced in five years after Yuri's birth. He was raised by his mother, who belonged to the Greek diaspora of Crimea. In 1937 she moved to Moscow to study directing at VGIK under Sergei Eisenstein, and later worked at the Gorky Film Studio as an assistant director and a dubbing director.

As a child Yuri took part in film dubbing. After the school he considered becoming an Orthodox priest, but then decided to follow his mother's steps and entered screenwriting courses at VGIK led by Nikolai Figurovsky which he finished in 1980. During the studies he met Alexander Sokurov who became his close friend and a regular collaborator since then. By 2017 they have produced 12 feature films together. Their first movie — The Lonely Voice of Man — was finished in 1978. Despite Andrei Tarkovsky's approval, it was called «a propaganda of Russian idealism» and banned for nine years, released only in 1987.

Same happened to their next film Mournful Unconcern: finished in 1983, it was released only in 1987. It was also nominated for the Golden Bear at the 37th Berlin International Film Festival. After that Sokurov and Arabov produced a lot of critically acclaimed movies, most famous of them being the so-called «tetralogy of power» which includes Moloch (1999), Taurus (2001), The Sun (2005) and Faust (2011), a film that won the Golden Lion at the 68th Venice International Film Festival.

For his work on Moloch Yuri received the Best Screenplay Award at the 1999 Cannes Film Festival and the Best Script award at the 1999 Russian Guild of Film Critics Awards. His screenplay for Taurus was also distinguished by the Best Script award at the 2001 Russian Guild of Film Critics Awards and the 2002 Nika Award. He also received Nika Awards for both The Sun and Faust, as well as A Room and a Half — a semi-biographical film about Joseph Brodsky directed and co-written by Andrei Khrzhanovsky in 2009.

Arabov created over 30 screenplays for both feature films and TV series. Besides Sokurov, he often works with Aleksandr Proshkin and his son Andrei Proshkin, both prominent Russian film directors. A member of the Union of Cinematographers of the Russian Federation. Since 1992 he has been also working as an educator at VGIK where he is currently serving as the head of the Screenwriting Faculty.

Author of several novels, including Big-Beat (2003), Wonder (2009), Orlean (2011) and A Butterfly Encounter (2014), as well as a number of poetry books.

Filmography

Films
1978 — The Lonely Voice of Man
1983 — Mournful Unconcern
1988 — Days of Eclipse
1988 — Mister Designer
1989 — The Devoted
1989 — Save and Protect
1990 — The Second Circle
1990 — The Sphinx
1992 — Presence
1992 — Stone
1994 — Whispering Pages
1997 — Mother and Son
1999 — Moloch
2001 — Taurus
2002 — Modern Game
2002 — A Cat and a Half
2004 — Apocrypha : Music for Peter and Paul
2005 — The Sun
2006 — Horror which is always with you
2008 — Yuri's Day
2009 — The Miracle
2009 — A Room and a Half
2011 — Faust
2012 — The Horde
2013 — Mirrors
2015 — Orlean
2015 — The Cage
2015 — The Guards
2016 — The Monk and the Demon
2020 — The Nose or the Conspiracy of Mavericks

Television
1990 — Nikolai Vavilov, 6 episodes
2005 — Doctor Zhivago, 11 episodes
2005 — The Case of "Dead Souls", 8 episodes
2007 — Lenin's Testament, 12 episodes

Bibliography
2003 — Big-Beat — Moscow: Andrew's Flag, 400 pages. 
2009 — Wonder — Moscow: AST, 224 pages. 
2011 — Orlean — Moscow: AST, 224 pages. 
2014 — A Butterfly Encounter — Moscow: AST, 352 pages.

References

External links

Yuri Arabov page at the British Film Institute
Main Role. Yuri Arabov talk show by Russia-K, 2014 (in Russian)
Yuri Arabov: “Andrei Proshkin took risks of this script” at the Moscow International Film Festival (2015)

1954 births
Living people
Academicians of the National Academy of Motion Picture Arts and Sciences of Russia
Gerasimov Institute of Cinematography alumni
Academic staff of the Gerasimov Institute of Cinematography
Recipients of the Nika Award
Russian male novelists
Russian male poets
Russian people of Greek descent
20th-century Russian screenwriters
Male screenwriters
20th-century Russian male writers
State Prize of the Russian Federation laureates
Soviet screenwriters
Cannes Film Festival Award for Best Screenplay winners